Cyanea calycina is a flowering plant in the Campanulaceae family. The IUCN has classified the species as critically endangered.  
It is native to the Hawaiian Islands. An example is being monitored with a plant cam.

Description 
It is a flowering perennial shrub from  1 to 3 meters tall.

Taxonomy 
Flowering plant species first discovered by Ludolf Karl Adelbert von Chamisso, and described by Lammers  in The Leipzig catalogue of vascular plants, in 2020.

References

External links 
 Cyanea calycina, or haha, in the Wai‘anae Mountains on O‘ahu USGS

calycina